Jakub "Kuba" Błaszczykowski (born 14 December 1985) is a Polish professional footballer who plays as a winger for Wisła Kraków, businessman and Wisła Kraków's part owner. He started his professional football at Wisła Kraków establishing himself at a young age. In 2007, he joined Borussia Dortmund, where he spent the majority of his career, making over 250 appearances and winning two Bundesliga titles, two DFL-Supercups, and one DFB-Pokal.

Błaszczykowski was twice named Polish Footballer of the Year in 2008 and 2010. With 108 appearances, he is the second most capped player for Poland, and captained them as they co-hosted UEFA Euro 2012, while also appearing at UEFA Euro 2016 and the 2018 FIFA World Cup.

Club career

Early career
Raised in Truskolasy near Częstochowa, Błaszczykowski began training at Raków Częstochowa when he was eight years old. In 2002, at age 16, he joined the youth side of Górnik Zabrze. In early 2003, he joined KS Częstochowa and played in the Polish fourth league until the end of 2004. His uncle, former Poland captain Jerzy Brzęczek, then helped him get a trial at Wisła Kraków, where he impressed then-manager Werner Lička.

Błaszczykowski quickly broke into Wisła's first team, with his first league appearance coming on 20 March 2005 against Polonia Warsaw. By the end of the season, he was an established part of the starting 11. With Wisła he won the Polish Ekstraklasa title in his debut season, and they were runners-up the following season. Additionally he won Canal+'s "Football Oscar" for the best midfielder in the Polish top division. He was also named to the Ekstraklasa Best XI of the 2006–07 season in the Polish Footballers' Association voting.

Borussia Dortmund

In February 2007, Błaszczykowski signed a four-year contract with Borussia Dortmund for an undisclosed fee, joining the Bundesliga side in July of that year. He played with the shirt name "Kuba", a diminutive form of his first name, until 2012. During the 2008–09 season, he was plagued by a torn leg muscle. He was, nevertheless, voted Polish Footballer of the Year in December 2008.

Błaszczykowski with Borussia Dortmund won the Bundesliga title for two consecutive seasons in 2010–11 and 2011–12. He also won the 2011–12 DFB-Pokal, providing two assists in the final 5–2 victory over Bayern Munich. In July 2012, he was named on UEFA's 32-man shortlist for the Best Player in Europe award.

Błaszczykowski signed a new contract with Borussia Dortmund on 24 July 2012, keeping him with the German club until 2016. He scored his first goal of the 2012–13 season in the opening round of the DFB-Pokal on 18 August 2012, setting up Marco Reus for Dortmund's opening goal before netting their second, as the Yellow-Blacks achieved a 3–0 victory at FC Oberneuland. On 25 January 2013, Błaszczykowski scored two goals within the first 21 minutes against 1. FC Nürnberg, sending Dortmund on their way to a 3–0 victory and putting the defending champions within just nine points of league leaders Bayern. In Dortmund's 3–2 victory over Bayer 04 Leverkusen on 3 February, which moved Dortmund above Leverkusen into second place, he converted a penalty in the ninth minute to put his side up 2–0. He scored Dortmund's third goal in a 3–0 rout of Shakhtar Donetsk on 5 March, completing a 5–2 aggregate victory over the Ukrainian champions as Dortmund progressed to the quarter-finals of the Champions League. The result meant that the Yellow-Blacks had advanced to the quarter-finals for the first time in 15 years.

On 2 June 2013, Błaszczykowski signed a new contract with Borussia Dortmund, keeping him at the club until 2018. On 27 July 2013, Błaszczykowski won the 2013 DFL-Supercup with Dortmund 4–2 against rivals Bayern Munich. On 26 October 2013, Błaszczykowski scored a goal for Dortmund in the Revierderby against rivals Schalke in a 3–1 win for Dortmund.

Fiorentina (loan)
On 31 August 2015, Błaszczykowski joined Fiorentina for a season-long loan from Borussia Dortmund.

VfL Wolfsburg
On 1 August 2016, Błaszczykowski joined VfL Wolfsburg on a three-year contract for a reported fee of €5 million. In January 2019, his contract with Wolfsburg was dissolved.

Return to Wisła Kraków
On 7 February 2019, Błaszczykowski rejoined former club Wisła Kraków on a free transfer. In April 2020 he became part owner of the club.

International career

Błaszczykowski debuted for the Poland national team on 28 March 2006 in a friendly against Saudi Arabia. He did not receive a call up for the 2006 FIFA World Cup due to injury. He scored his first goal for Poland on 22 August 2007 in a friendly against Russia. Błaszczykowski was an important part of Poland's successful UEFA Euro 2008 qualifying campaign and was named in Poland's squad for UEFA Euro 2008, but he withdrew due to injury. On 17 November 2010, in a friendly match against Ivory Coast, Błaszczykowski made his debut as captain of the Polish national team.

Euro 2012
On 8 June 2012, in the opening game of UEFA Euro 2012 against Greece, Błaszczykowski assisted Robert Lewandowski's goal in a 1–1 draw. In the second group stage match against Russia, he scored a long range equalising goal in a 1–1 draw and was named Man of the Match.

World Cup 2014 qualifying
Błaszczykowski was Poland's current top scorer in their 2014 World Cup qualifying campaign with four goals. His first two strikes were from the penalty spot, his first gave Poland an early lead in their opening group game with Montenegro, a match which finished 2–2. His second goal came four days later, again giving Poland the lead in their 2–0 win over Moldova. He did not feature in the 1–1 draw with England due to injury. Błaszczykowski got the assist for Piszczek's goal in the 3–1 defeat to Ukraine. He did not feature against San Marino four days later due to an injury sustained in the pre-match warm up. On 7 June 2013, he scored his third goal of the qualifying campaign by grabbing the opener against Moldova – a game which finished 1–1. After San Marino scored an equaliser in a qualifying match on 10 September 2013, Błaszczykowski restored the lead just a minute later and Poland went on to win the match 5–1.

Euro 2016

During nearly half of the qualifying campaign, Błaszczykowski was out of the national squad due to injury. He marked his return when coming on as a substitute in a qualifying match against Georgia, where the former Polish captain provided an assist against Georgia for the current captain, Robert Lewandowski, who scored a hat-trick in the final five minutes of the match in a 4–0 win. He scored a penalty against Gibraltar in an 8–1 victory and played in all the remaining games of qualification.

On 12 June, Poland's opening game, Błaszczykowski played a key role in providing a cross and assisting in Arkadiusz Milik's goal in a 1–0 win over Northern Ireland. This was Poland's first win at European Championship. Błaszczykowski also played in a goalless draw against Germany, but was dropped to the bench for the final group game against Ukraine. He came on as a substitute at halftime to score the only goal which sealed Poland the victory, earned them second spot in the group with seven points, behind Germany on goal difference. This marked their first advancement to the knockout stage at a European championship. On 25 June, the first game in the group of 16, Błaszczykowski scored the opening goal for Poland against Switzerland. The game ended 1–1, going into extra time and then a penalty shootout. Błaszczykowski delivered his spot kick and Poland won 5–4, advancing to the quarter final. The next knockout game against Portugal ended 1–1 after extra time, but Poland lost in the penalty shootout after he could not convert his penalty kick.

Personal life
As a child, Błaszczykowski witnessed a family tragedy which had a major influence on his life. In September 1996, when he was 10 years old, his father stabbed his mother to death. After his father went to prison, he and his older brother, Dawid, were raised by their grandmother. He briefly gave up football, but with the encouragement of his uncle, Jerzy Brzęczek, a former captain of the Poland national football team, he decided to resume training at Raków Częstochowa two months later. Błaszczykowski has credited his successes to his grandmother. He dedicates every goal he scores to his mother and can be seen looking up to the sky during goal celebrations.

Błaszczykowski married Agata Gołaszewska in June 2010. Their daughter, Oliwia, was born in 2011. Their second daughter, Lena, was born in 2014. 

He is a devout Catholic who reads the Bible on a daily basis, prays often, and participates in the Nie wstydzę się Jezusa (Polish for "I am not ashamed of Jesus") project.

Career statistics

Club

International

Scores and results list Poland's goal tally first, score column indicates score after each Błaszczykowski goal.

Honours
Wisła Kraków
 Ekstraklasa: 2004–05

Borussia Dortmund
 Bundesliga: 2010–11, 2011–12
 DFB-Pokal: 2011–12
 DFL-Supercup: 2008, 2013, 2014
 UEFA Champions League runner-up: 2012–13

Individual
 Ekstraklasa Midfielder of the Year: 2006
 Ekstraklasa Best XI: 2006–07
 Polish Footballer of the Year: 2008, 2010
 Polish Footballer of the Year by Polish Footballers' Association: 2010
 Poland national football team's Best Player: 2010
 Footballer of the Year by the readers of "Sport": 2008, 2010
 Borussia Dortmund Player of the Year: 2008

See also
List of men's footballers with 100 or more international caps

References

External links

 
 
 

1985 births
Living people
Polish Roman Catholics
Sportspeople from Częstochowa
Polish footballers
Association football midfielders
Wisła Kraków players
Borussia Dortmund players
ACF Fiorentina players
VfL Wolfsburg players
Ekstraklasa players
Bundesliga players
Serie A players
Poland youth international footballers
Poland under-21 international footballers
Poland international footballers
UEFA Euro 2012 players
UEFA Euro 2016 players
2018 FIFA World Cup players
FIFA Century Club
Polish expatriate footballers
Polish expatriate sportspeople in Germany
Polish expatriate sportspeople in Italy
Expatriate footballers in Germany
Expatriate footballers in Italy
Jan Długosz University alumni
21st-century Polish businesspeople
People from Kłobuck County